The Malian Women's Cup is a women's association football competition in Mali. pitting regional teams against each other. It was established in 2011. The winner of the 2021 edition is Super Lionnes d'Hamdallaye for the first time.

History
The first cup competition in Mali was the FMF President's Cup and was held from 1997 to 2004. The second competition was the Moneygram Cup and was held from 2007 to 2009.

On 2011, the Malian Football Federation launched the Malian national women's Cup.

Finals

Most successful clubs

See also 
 Malian Women's Championship

References

Mal
Football competitions in Mali